Ilko Dimitrov Dimitrov is a Bulgarian jurist and poet, born on 23 December 1955 in Sofia, Bulgaria. He served as deputy defense minister of the Republic of Bulgaria (2003–2005). Member of the 40th National Assembly of Bulgaria. Member of the Bulgarian Writers Association.

Literary works

Opit za opredelenie (Attempt at a Definition), poetry, 1989
Prikazki za Popo (Tales of Poppo), a book for children, 1992
Obraten vodopad (Reverse Waterfall), poetry, 1995
Vselena po zdrach (Universe at Dusk), poetry, 1998
Parkat (The Park), a poem, 1999 - Annual award of the Bulgarian Writers Association, 1999
Trite koshnitsi (The Three Baskets), poetry, 2000
Razchlenyavane (Dismemberment), a poem, 2001
Dvamata sadruzhnitsi (The Two Associates), essays, 2007
Byalo (White), selected poetry, 2008
Prodavachat na kontsi (The Thread Seller), a poem, 2009 - "Ivan Nikolov" National Poetry Award for 2009.
Bog v Nyu York (God in New York), prose, 2010
4etiri (Four), poetry, 2011
tova edno/ mozhesh li go (This Oneness), poetry, 2013

In translation:
 in Serbian - Molitva za novu zemqu, a poem, Gradina (Niš), N 12, 1997, tr. by Velimir Kostov and Mila Vasov;
 in English - Untitled miniatures, Nthposition (UK webzine), November 2003, tr. by Zdravka Evtimova;
 in English - Untitled miniatures, The MAG - The Muse Apprentice Guild (USA webzine), Fall 2003, tr. by Zdravka Evtimova;
 in English - The Thread Seller, a poem, The Literary Club (BG webzine), 2009, tr. by Hristianna

External links
Short profile at Nthposition (ENG)

Ilko Dimitrov - electronic publications at The Literary Club (BG/ENG)

Bulgarian poets
Bulgarian writers
Members of the National Assembly (Bulgaria)
1955 births
Living people